is a railway station in the city of Ōsaki, Miyagi Prefecture, Japan, operated by the East Japan Railway Company (JR East).

Lines
Matsuyamamachi Station is served by the Tōhoku Main Line, and is located 391.5 rail kilometers from the official starting point of the line at Tokyo Station.

Station layout
The station has one ground-level side platform and one ground-level island platform connected to the station building by a footbridge. The station has a Midori no Madoguchi staffed ticket office.

Platforms

History
Matsuyamamachi Station opened on December 25, 1908. The station was absorbed into the JR East network upon the privatization of the Japanese National Railways (JNR) on April 1, 1987.

Passenger statistics
In fiscal 2018, the station was used by an average of 592 passengers daily (boarding passengers only).

Surrounding area

Kashimadai Post Office

See also
 List of Railway Stations in Japan

References

External links

  

Railway stations in Miyagi Prefecture
Tōhoku Main Line
Railway stations in Japan opened in 1908
Ōsaki, Miyagi
Stations of East Japan Railway Company